Farjad Nabi is a Pakistani writer, film producer, director, cinematographer and documentary maker. His 2013 feature film Zinda Bhaag, co written and co directed with Meenu Gaur, became the first Pakistani film in over fifty years to be submitted for Oscar consideration in the 'Foreign Language Film Award’ category at the 86th Academy Awards He rose to prominence in 1997, when his debut film Nusrat has left the building...But When? won the Second Best Film Award at Film South Asia, Kathmandu. In 1999 his second film    
No One Believes the Professor entered the Film South Asia festival and won the Best Film Award.

Personal life
Farjad was born to Muslim parents in 1969 in Lahore, Pakistan.

Work and career
Nabi is a Lahore-based director who has directed award-winning documentaries including Nusrat has Left the Building… But When? and No One Believes the Professor. He has also documented the work of Lahore film industry's last poster artist in The Final Touch. Nabi has produced and presented a musical documentary on interior Sindh called Aaj ka Beejal for BBCUrdu. Since then he has been recording the dying breed of gallivants (story singers) in the Lahore region. His Punjabi stage plays Annhi Chunni di Tikki (Bread of Chaff & Husk) and Jeebho Jani di Kahani (The Story of Jeebho Jani) has been recently staged and published. He is presently working on a documentary film and monograph along with Meenu Gaur on the Lahore film industry also known as Lollywood.

Zinda Bhaag

In 2013 Farjad co-directed  Zinda Bhaag with Meenu Gaur, Under Meenu's husband Mazhar Zaidi's film production Matteela Films which earned him a critical acclaimed and recognition in film world. In an interview he describe the inspiration of film: "When we heard stories shared by friends and family members who had risked everything to do the 'dunky,' we were fascinated by these stories; [however], one question still rankled in us. It was, "Why do men risk their lives to do the 'dunky'?" Our research had dispelled the notion that it is a pure economic question. The truth is there is no one answer. Men do want to change their lives overnight, especially young men who find all legitimate doors closed for them. At the same time, it is almost a tradition which has been followed through generations. further adding he said, "Meenu and I have been collaborating on many projects. We have done documentaries, music videos and scripts together. Right now we have a couple of documentaries we want to finish. One is called The Ghost of Maula Jutt, which is about the rise and decay of Lollywood."
Zinda Bhaag became one of the highest-grossing of Pakistan and has won many accolades and recognition including an official selection for Best Foreign Language Film at 86th Academy Awards however was out of the competition for the final race. Zinda Bhaag was only the third Pakistani film in 50 years to get recognition at the Oscars, after 1959's The Day Shall Dawn and 1963's The Veil.

Filmography

References

External links 
 
 

Living people
People from Lahore
Pakistani film directors
Pakistani film producers
1969 births